Muqadar is a 1996 Indian Hindi-language action drama film. Produced by Rajiv Babbar and directed by T L V Prasad, it stars Mithun Chakraborty, Puneet Issar and Kiran Kumar  and Moushumi Chatterjee, Simran, Ayesha Jhulka and Hemant Birje in supporting roles.

Plot

Shiva (Mithun Chakraborty) always believed in making his own destiny. So when he fell in love with Meena (Ayesha Jhulka), daughter of his arch-rival and enemy Parashuram (Puneet Issar), he knew he was inviting trouble. But Shiva married her. Parshuram could not bear the humiliation and decides to destroy Shiva. The city trembled when these two brave lions of the underworld clashed. The gang war between the rival gang of Parshuram Shiva rocked the city. Additional Commissioner of Police S. K. Khurana (Kiran Kumar) is appointed to bring the city back to normal. Shiva decides to eliminate the ACP. Shiva plants a bomb. Just when he is going to activate the bomb, he sees S. K. Khurana accompanied with his wife Bharati (Moushumi Chatterjee) and his daughter Pooja (Simran). Shiva does not activate the bomb, despite his hatred for his mother Bharati, Shiva is unable to kill her. Bharati goes to find out about Shiva. She goes to meet him. Shiva humiliates Bharati. He cannot pardon Bharati for having abandoned him for his happiness. Although Shiva was alive she had accepted that he was dead. No one knows what destiny has in store for each one of them. Pooja conceives a child. S. K. Khurana opposes Pooja's marriage to a criminal's son. Bharati once again comes to Shiva for help. But, will Shiva pardon his mother? Will he help her? Will Parashuram be able to settle the score? Shiva had never accepted his destiny's decision, is he able to change it this time? These questions form the rest of the story.

Cast

Mithun Chakraborty as Shiva
Ayesha Jhulka as Meena
Simran as Pooja 
Moushumi Chatterjee as Bharati 
Hemant Birje as Sudhir
Puneet Issar as Parashuram
Rohit Kumar as Rohit
Kiran Kumar as Commissioner of Police S.K. Khurana
Asrani as Jackson
Gavin Packard as Gavin

Music

Reception
Most of Mithun's 1996 releases were successful as they followed the low-budget formula. Muqadar was a satisfying success at the box-office helping producers and distributors.

References

External links
 
 https://archive.today/20130126094855/http://ibosnetwork.com/asp/filmbodetails.asp?id=Muqadar

1990s Hindi-language films
1996 films
Films scored by Anand–Milind
Films scored by Rajesh Roshan
Mithun's Dream Factory films
Films shot in Ooty
Films directed by T. L. V. Prasad